Eumesembrinella is a genus of blow fly in the family Mesembrinellidae.

Species
E. benoisti (Séguy, 1925)
E. cyaneicincta (Surcouf, 1919)
E. quadrilineata (Fabricius, 1805)
E. randa (Walker, 1849)

References

Mesembrinellidae
Diptera of South America